Dayne Kinniard (born 16 July 1982) is an Australian motocross rider for Zoo York Skateboard Company. He has won several competitions.

X Games competition history

References
10 Questions With Alex - 07/18/02
EXPN.com
Motopress.net: "Dayne Kinnaird Electrifies Selland Arena"
Andy Jones and Dayne Kinnaird Win in Worcester

People from New South Wales
1982 births
Living people
Australian motocross riders
X Games athletes